MTR (Mass Transit Railway) is the mass transit system of Hong Kong.

MTR may also refer to:

Codes and symbols 
 Los Garzones Airport, Montería, Córdoba, Colombia, IATA code
 Mesa Royalty Trust, a natural gas royalty trust, NYSE stock symbol
 Montour Railroad, reporting mark
 Central Station (Montreal), Quebec, Canada, Amtrak code
 5-Methyltetrahydrofolate-homocysteine methyltransferase

Organisations 
 Mavalli Tiffin Room, an Indian food company
 Former Melbourne Talk Radio, Victoria, Australia 
 Memphis Teacher Residency
 MTR Gaming Group
 Roman Traditional Movement (Movimento Tradizionale Romano)

Places 
 Museum of Television & Radio (MT&R), later Paley Center for Media

Transportation 
 MTR Corporation, operator of Hong Kong Mass Transit Railway
 MTR Crossrail, London
 MTR Properties
 MTR Western, a motorcoach operator in North America
 Matraman railway station in East Jakarta, Indonesia (station code MTR)

Other uses 
 Materials testing reactor, a research reactor type
 Materials Testing Reactor, Idaho, US
 Mill test report (metals industry)
 Mobile Termination Rate between telecoms operators
 Mountaintop removal, in coal mining
 Goodyear Tire and Rubber Company MT/R
 Multitrack recording
 MTR (software), a "traceroute" computer program